The Hadjigeorgakis Kornesios Mansion is situated near the Archbishopric, in the neighbourhood of Saint Antonios in Nicosia, Cyprus, where the wealthy notables of the Greek community traditionally used to live.

Overview
The mansion is the most important example of urban architecture of the last century of Ottoman rule that survives in old Nicosia. It opened on 3 May 1960 with the aid of public subscription, three years after a foundation was established to protect the property from developers who wanted to demolish the block.

History of the house

The owner of the mansion, Hadjigeorgakis Kornesios, was a dragoman, the official interpreter for the Divan (Council) of the Sultan for thirty years from 1779. This title, which was one of the most prestigious titles given to the local Christians by the Ottoman authorities, gave the opportunity to Kornesios to accumulate huge wealth and power. His power brought jealousy to his enemies, who cunningly managed to have him beheaded on 31 March 1809 in Constantinople (modern day Istanbul).

The house was built in 1793 with local bloc-cut sandstone and is a two-storey building. The monogram of the owner and the date of its erection can be seen on a marble tablet inside the entrance. The architectural plan of the building in the form of a Greek "Π" surrounds a central garden with a fountain and a private bathhouse (Hammam) which has three rooms. On the ground floor the servants’ quarters and the kitchen were situated. Roofed wooden stairs with a stone base lead to the entrance hall on the first floor from the courtyard. The official reception room and the living areas communicated with this reception hall. The official reception room (the onda), at the end of the east wing, differs from the other rooms with its exceptional carved wooden, gilded and painted decoration, which liken it to other official reception rooms in many mansions of the Ottoman Empire.

Today
Today the mansion, which was awarded the Europa Nostra prize for its exemplary renovation work, functions as the Ethnological Museum, Lefkosia (The House of Hadjigeorgakis Kornesios). The address is: 20 Patriarchou Grigoriou St, Nicosia.  The entrance fees is €2.50.

Gallery

See also 

Dervish Pasha Mansion
Tourism in Cyprus
History of Cyprus

References

External links
 Museum website

Houses completed in 1793
Museums established in 1960
Houses in Cyprus
Buildings and structures in Nicosia
Museums in Nicosia
History of Nicosia